Živko is a South Slavic masculine name and means "life", "alive". The Bulgarian variant is Zhivko.

It may refer to:

 Živko Andrijašević, Montenegrin historian and writer
 Živko Anočić, Croatian actor
 Živko Budimir, Bosnian Croat politician
 Živko Čingo, Macedonian writer
 Živko Gocić, Serbian water polo player
 Živko Kustić, Croatian writer
 Živko Lukić, Serbian footballer
 Živko Nikolić, Yugoslav and Montenegrin film director
 Živko Popovski, Macedonian architect
 Živko Radišić. Bosnian Serb politician
 Živko Slijepčević, Serbian football manager and player
 Živko Stojsavljević, Serbian painter
 Živko Šibalić, birth name of the Serbian bishop Teodosije
 Živko Topalović, Yugoslav socialist politician
 Živko Zalar, Croatian cinematographer
 Živko Živković, Serbian footballer

See also
Živkovac, village in Grocka municipality, Serbia
Živkovci, village in Ljig municipality, Serbia
Živkovo, village in Leskovac municipality, Serbia
Živković Kosa, village in Vojnić municipality, Croatia
Živković, South Slavic surname

Slavic masculine given names
Bosnian masculine given names
Croatian masculine given names
Macedonian masculine given names
Montenegrin masculine given names
Serbian masculine given names
Slovene masculine given names